Thomas Robinson Jr. (1800 – October 28, 1843) was an American lawyer and politician from Georgetown, in Sussex County, Delaware. He was a member of the Democratic Party, and served as United States Representative from Delaware.

Early life and family
Robinson was born 1800 in Georgetown, Delaware.  He graduated from Princeton College, studied law and was admitted to the Delaware Bar in 1823, and began practice in Sussex County, Delaware.

Professional and political career
Robinson became Treasurer of Sussex County in 1823, and was elected as a commissioner on the county Levy Court in 1831 and 1832. He served two years representing Delaware in the U.S. House of Representatives. Elected as a member of the Democratic Party, he served from March 4, 1839 until March 3, 1841.

Death and legacy
Robinson died at Georgetown, Delaware, and is buried there in the Old Cemetery of St. George's Chapel.

Almanac
Elections are held the first Tuesday after November 1. U.S. Representatives took office March 4 and have a two-year term.

References

External links
Biographical Directory of the U.S. Congress
Delaware's Members of Congress

The Political Graveyard

Places with more information
Delaware Historical Society; website; 505 North Market Street, Wilmington, Delaware 19801; (302) 655-7161
University of Delaware; Library website; 181 South College Avenue, Newark, Delaware 19717; (302) 831-2965

1800 births
1843 deaths
People from Georgetown, Delaware
Princeton University alumni
Delaware lawyers
Burials in Sussex County, Delaware
Democratic Party members of the United States House of Representatives from Delaware
19th-century American politicians
19th-century American lawyers